The Madon is a  long river in the Vosges and Meurthe-et-Moselle départements, northeastern France. Its source is near Vioménil. It flows generally north. It is a left tributary of the Moselle into which it flows at Pont-Saint-Vincent, near Nancy.

Départements and communes along its course
This list is ordered from source to mouth: 
Vosges: Vioménil, Escles, Lerrain, Les Vallois, Pont-lès-Bonfays, Frénois, Légéville-et-Bonfays, Begnécourt, Bainville-aux-Saules, Hagécourt, Valleroy-aux-Saules, Maroncourt, Velotte-et-Tatignécourt, Hymont, Vroville, Mattaincourt, Mirecourt, Poussay, Mazirot, Chauffecourt, Ambacourt, Bettoncourt, Vomécourt-sur-Madon, Pont-sur-Madon, Xaronval, Marainville-sur-Madon, Battexey
Meurthe-et-Moselle: Bralleville, Jevoncourt, Xirocourt, Vaudigny, Vaudeville, Affracourt, Haroué, Gerbécourt-et-Haplemont, Ormes-et-Ville, Lemainville, Voinémont, Ceintrey, Autrey, Pulligny, Pierreville, Frolois, Xeuilley, Bainville-sur-Madon, Méréville, Pont-Saint-Vincent

At Ambacourt, two kilometers downstream from Mirecourt, the river accommodates a small colony of beavers:  this is believed to reflect the quality of the water.

References

Rivers of France
Rivers of Meurthe-et-Moselle
Rivers of Vosges (department)
Rivers of Grand Est